Saint Abundius the Sacristan (also Abonde, or, variously, Acontius) (died c. 564) was a sacristan of the Church of Saint Peter in Rome.

Life
His holy life was reportedly an inspiration to all who knew him, and several miracles were attributed to him. For one, he is reported as having miraculously healed someone of gout by his prayers.

Another story of a miraculous healing by Abundius is told by Saint Gregory the Great in his Dialogues (Book III, Chapter 25). Gregory reports that there was a young woman who was suffering from palsy, and had been praying to Saint Peter to be healed. The saint appeared to her in a vision and told her to go to Abundius to be healed. The woman did not know Abundius, but sought him out at the basilica and engaged in the following conversation with him:

In the same work, Gregory also makes note of another saintly sacristan of Saint Peter's, Theodore, who lived before Abundius.

Veneration
The Roman Martyrology lists Abundius briefly on his feast day, April 14, which is kept as a feast at Saint Peter's.

References

External links

Saint Gregory the Great's hagiography of Abundius, although he refers to him as Acontius

564 deaths
Burials at St. Peter's Basilica
Year of birth unknown